Beautiful Wonderful Perfect or Er rer is a 2005 Thai family comedy film directed by Poj Arnon.

Cast
Veerapak Kansuwan as Tong
Nawarat Techarathanaprasert as Luk-kaew
Tat Na Takuatung as Preecha
Choosak Iamsook as Sumruay
Kanya Rattanapetch as Suay
Pritsana Priesang as Wan
Alisa Intusmith as Aew

Awards
15th Suphannahong National Film Awards (2005) for
Best Supporting Actress - Sathita Kaewchaum
Best Actress - Nawarat Techarathanaprasert
Best Original Song - Nueng Nai Hua Chai Po by Saensaeb

References

2005 films
Thai-language films
2005 comedy films
Thai comedy films
Films directed by Poj Arnon